Omladinski fudbalski klub Durmitor is a Montenegrin football club based in Žabljak. They competed in the Montenegrin Third League, before the men's team was disbanded in 2013.

History 
Founded in 2001, OFK Durmitor is among the youngest football teams in Montenegro and the only one from Durmitor mountain region. Coming from Žabljak, a town with highest elevation on the Balkans, OFK Durmitor started as an enthusiastic project, but soon played their first official games in the Montenegrin Fourth League - Northern Region.
Following Montenegrin independence, OFK Durmitor became a member of the Montenegrin Third League, but never succeeded to gain promotion to highest-rank competitions. OFK Durmitor's best result was made during the 2010-11 season when they finished as a third-placed team in the Montenegrin Third League - Northern Region.

Final squad 
During their last season in the Montenegrin Third League, OFK Durmitor played with following players: Drobnjak, M. Džaković, Đ. Španjević, Pašić, Bojović, Raonić, Damjanović, Radulović, Kovačević, Krsmanović. Pićurić, D. Džaković, Z. Španjević. Manager: Vitko Španjević.

Women's team 
Since 2008, Žabljak also hosts ŽFK Durmitor - a women's football team, which is a part of OFK Durmitor. ŽFK Durmitor participated in the inaugural season of the Montenegrin Women's League, as well as subsequent seasons.

Stadium 

OFK Durmitor plays their home games at Ravni Žabljak Stadium, built at the time of the team's foundation. The stadium has one stand, with a capacity of 1,000 seats. Situated on a high mountain, with extreme elevation, the pitch is under the snow during the winter months. Local authorities stated they're planning renovation of the stadium.

See also 
 Durmitor
 Montenegrin Third League
 Football in Montenegro
 Žabljak

References 

Association football clubs established in 2001
Defunct football clubs in Montenegro
2001 establishments in Montenegro
Žabljak Municipality